The 22nd Trampoline World Championships were held in Odense, Denmark from 26 July to 28 July 2001.

Results

Men

Trampoline Individual

Trampoline Team

Trampoline Synchro

Double Mini Trampoline

Double Mini Trampoline Team

Tumbling

Tumbling Team

Women

Trampoline Individual

Trampoline Team

Trampoline Synchro

Double Mini Trampoline

Double Mini Trampoline Team

Tumbling

Tumbling Team

References
 Gymmedia

Trampoline World Championships
Trampoline Gymnastics World Championships
2001 in Danish sport
International gymnastics competitions hosted by Denmark